Nuestra Belleza El Salvador 2012 took place on April 27, 2012 at the Hotel Royal Decameron in Salinitas, Sonsonate. Nuestra Belleza Universo 2011, Alejandra Ochoa and Nuestra Belleza Mundo 2011 crowned their perspective successors at the end of the event. The co winners will represent El Salvador at Miss Universe 2012, Miss World 2012 and Miss Continente Americano 2012. Also the overall winner, "Nuestra Belleza Universo 2012" will take home even more prizes than years before, including a brand new Honda car.

For the first time ever, the national preliminary castings took place live on the internet on the official website. The finalists were selected from 164 applicants who were presented to the three day casting made in the forum 4 of TCS in late January, early February judged by Raul Dominguez, Executive Producer of the event, Diana Rivera, head image of TCS and person in charge of the Miss Universe & Miss World franchise, and Tony Melara, runway model instructor. Both the opinion of the jury and public votes cast online were also taken into account in the selection of the 17 finalists.

Results

Contestants

External links

References

2012 beauty pageants